The Islamic Republic of Iran Handball Federation (IRIHF) is the governing body for Handball in Iran. It was founded in 1975, and has been a member of IHF since 1978. It is also a member of the Asian Handball Federation. The IRIHF is responsible for organizing the Iran men's national handball team .

IRIHF Presidents
 Amir Amin
 Haroun Mahdavi
 Mahmoud Mashhoun
 Amir Hosseini
 Mahmoud Mashhoun
 Mohammad Hamzeh Alipour
 Salimi
 Ali Mohammad Amirtash
 Alireza Rahimi (1994 - 2010)
 Jalal Kouzehgari (2010 - 2017)
 Alireza Rahimi (2017 - 2019)
 Alireza Pakdel (2019–Present)

Competitions hosted
 2020 Asian Men's Junior Handball Championship
 2014 Asian Men's Junior Handball Championship
 2010 Asian Men's Junior Handball Championship
 2008 Asian Men's Handball Championship
 2007 Asian Beach Handball Championship
 2006 Asian Men's Youth Handball Championship
 2004 Asian Men's Club League Handball Championship
 2002 Asian Men's Handball Championship
 2001 Asian Men's Club League Handball Championship
 2000 Asian Men's Junior Handball Championship
 1999 Asian Men's Club League Handball Championship
 1990 Asian Men's Junior Handball Championship

External links

Asian Handball Federation
Handball federation
Handball in Iran
Sports organizations established in 1975